The Delvon Lamarr Organ Trio, also known as DLO3, is an American soul-jazz group founded in 2015. The band has released five albums. Their debut album, titled Close But No Cigar, charted at number one on the U.S. Contemporary Jazz Albums chart.

Career 
The Delvon Lamarr Organ Trio was founded in 2015 and originally consisted of keyboardist Delvon Lamarr (Dumas) on Hammond B-3, guitarist Colin Higgins and drummer David McGraw. Soon after guitarist Jimmy James (Williams) replaced Higgins. All members had been active instrumentalists in the Seattle music scene. With the help of Lamarr's wife, Amy Novo (AKA "Shortcake Mafia"), acting as manager and booking agent, the group was solidified. Originally a drummer and trumpet player, Lamarr switched to organ at the age of 22. He said he picked up the instrument naturally by observing organist/keyboardist Joe Doria, whose band Lamarr was drumming in at the time. James and McGraw had previously co-founded "The True Loves", a Seattle-based nine-piece soul band.

The DLO3 has toured in the United States and abroad and has performed in several music festivals including  the Detroit and the Monterey Jazz Festivals. The trio's debut album Close But No Cigar was originally released in 2016 (on CD), and was re-released in March 2018 (on both LP and CD) by Colemine Records. The album reached number one on the U.S. Contemporary Jazz Albums chart and number three on the U.S. Jazz Albums chart. In April 2018, the band released a live album titled Live at KEXP! (on both LP and CD) that was recorded May 13, 2017. It reached number 10 on the Jazz Albums chart. In 2018 the band toured nationally and in Europe in support of the albums. In late 2018, drummer Doug Octa Port replaced McGraw. Drummer Michael Duffy joined the band for their 2019 European Tour. New drummer, Dan "Vanilla" Weiss (from "The Sextones") joined in 2021. As of August 2022, drummer Julian "Thunderfoot" MacDonough will be replacing Weiss.

On January 29, 2021, the group released their sophomore studio album I Told You So via Colemine Records. The album debuted atop multiple Billboard Charts: number one on the Contemporary Jazz Album chart, number three on the Jazz Album chart, number four on the Tastemaker Album chart, and number 12 on the Heatseeker Album chart.

Style
The band's music is rhythm-based and rooted in the 1960s and 1970s soul-jazz, funk and blues styles, reminiscent of Booker T. & the M.G.'s and The Meters. Bandleader Lamarr described it as "soul music with a strong jazz influence". He credits their 'sound' to the chemistry of the band members.

Band members 

Current members
Delvon Lamarr – Hammond B-3 organ (2015–present)
Jimmy James – guitar (2015–present)
Julian (Thunderfoot) MacDonough – drums (2022–present)

Former
Colin Higgins – guitar (2015)
David McGraw – drums (2015–2018)
Doug Octa Port – drums (2018–2021)
Michael Duffy - drums (2019) (Touring member)
Dan (Vanilla) Weiss – drums (2021–2022)

Timeline

Discography 

LP/CD releases
Close But No Cigar (Novo Productions, 2016; reissue: Colemine CLMN-12019, 2018)
Live at KEXP! (Colemine CLMN-12020, recorded 5/13/17 [released 2018])
I Told You So (Colemine CLMN-12028, 2021)
Cold As Weiss (Colemine CLMN-12029, 2022)
Live In Loveland! (Colemine CLMN-12027, recorded 4/21/18 [released 2022])

45rpm vinyl singles
 "Concussion" (Colemine CLMN-150 A, 2017) 
 "Memphis" (Colemine CLMN-150 B, 2017)
 "Fo Sho" (Colemine CLMN-199 A, 2020)
 "Inner City Blues" (Colemine CLMN-199 B, 2020)
 "Jimmy's Groove (Pt. 1)" (Colemine CLMN-207 A, 2021) 
 "Jimmy's Groove (Pt. 2)" (Colemine CLMN-207 B, 2021) 
 "Cold As Weiss" (Colemine CLMN-224 A, 2021) 
 "Fried Soul" (Colemine CLMN-224 B, 2021)

References

External links 
 
 

American soul musical groups
American jazz ensembles from Washington (state)
Musical groups established in 2015
Musical groups from Seattle
2015 establishments in Washington (state)